Clark Sampson is an American curler,  and a 1971 United States men's curling champion.

Teams

References

External links
 
 

Living people
American male curlers
World curling champions
American curling champions
Year of birth missing (living people)